Trouble Shooter, originally released in Japan as , is a scrolling shooter developed and published by Vic Tokai for the Mega Drive/Genesis in 1991. The game was given a very distinct theme of self-parody between the enemies, story and dialogue. A sequel titled  was also released for the Mega Drive in Japan and Korea only.

Gameplay
A combat operative Madison is assigned to rescue a prince who has been taken hostage. Players assume control over Madison ( in Japanese) who is accompanied at all times by her partner Crystal ( in Japanese). Unlike Madison, Crystal can flip firing positions, allowing her to fire behind Madison, and is invulnerable to all enemy fire.

At the beginning of almost every stage, the players have to choose a special weapon they can use during combat. After every use, however, the weapon needs to recharge in order to be used again. Players can select from four different power-ups consisting of the usual shooter icons (speed-ups, life-ups, firepower and speed-downs). The player can stock up on Madison's hit points by collecting life-up icons, which is necessary as the game has no lives system and only offers the player three continues.

Reception
Trouble Shooter was mostly highly positively received by critics, including being rated a perfect score of 25/25 by Doctor Dave from GamePro. Les Ellis from Sega Pro gave it a more reserved review score of 73%, calling it "a rehash of Forgotten Worlds without all the great power-ups." Retrospectively, Ken Horowitz  from Sega-16 gave it an 8 out of 10, writing:  "I can’t recommend Trouble Shooter enough. Shooter and action fans alike are sure to enjoy it, and it should be cheap enough to find with little trouble. Ignore the box and just enjoy the game for the great little shooter that it is."

References

External links
Trouble Shooter and the Battle Mania series at MobyGames
Trouble Shooter at GameFAQs

1991 video games
Horizontally scrolling shooters
Sega Genesis games
Sega Genesis-only games
Single-player video games
Vic Tokai games
Video game franchises
Video games developed in Japan
Video games featuring female protagonists